Max is an unincorporated community in Max Township, Itasca County, Minnesota, United States; located within the Chippewa National Forest and the Leech Lake Indian Reservation.

The community is located southeast of Squaw Lake at the junction of Itasca County Roads 4 and 34.  State Highway 46 (MN 46) is nearby.

Nearby places include Squaw Lake, Spring Lake, Inger, and Alvwood.

Max is located 3.5 miles southeast of Squaw Lake.  Max is also located 25 miles northwest of Deer River.

Media

Television

References

 Rand McNally Road Atlas – 2007 edition – Minnesota entry
 Official State of Minnesota Highway Map – 2011/2012 edition
 Mn/DOT map of Itasca County – Sheet 2 – 2011 edition

Unincorporated communities in Itasca County, Minnesota
Unincorporated communities in Minnesota